The Man Who Married Himself is a 2010 British short comedy film directed by Garrick Hamm and written by Charlie Fish and Garrick Hamm. It stars Richard E. Grant, Emilia Fox, Celia Imrie, and Warren Clarke. The film is an adaptation of Charlie Fish's short story of the same name, first published at East of the Web.

The short won Best Comedy at the LA Shorts Fest and Rhode Island International Film Festival.

Premise
A man decides to marry himself, and learns some truths about life and love on the way.

Cast
 Richard E. Grant – Oliver Parker
 Emilia Fox – Sarah
 Warren Clarke – Bishop Zatarga
 Celia Imrie – Mother
 Malcolm Rogers – Father

Accolades

References

External links

 

2010 films
2010 comedy films
2010 short films
British comedy short films
2010s English-language films
2010s British films